Fiona Connor (born 1981) is a visual artist from New Zealand, currently based in Los Angeles.

Education
Fiona Connor was born in 1981 in Auckland, New Zealand. In 2004 she graduated from the Elam School of Fine Arts with a BFA/BA. She has also studied at the University of California, San Diego and University of Barcelona and has an MFA from the California Institute of the Arts. She is currently based in Los Angeles.

Work
Connor often replicates everyday objects in her sculptural installations. Simulacra of public noticeboards, drinking fountains, outdoor furniture, doors and so on draw attention to these often overlooked forms of civic infrastructure.  She also has an ongoing collaborative project with artist Michala Paludan, Newspaper Reading Club.

Connor has exhibited throughout New Zealand and internationally. Notable exhibitions include:
 Notes on the half the page, Gambia Castle, Auckland (2008), solo
 Something Transparent (please go round the back), Michael Lett, Auckland (2009), solo
 NEW10, Australian Centre for Contemporary Art (ACCA), Melbourne (2010), group
 On Forgery: is one thing better than another?, LAXART, Los Angeles (2011), group
 Prospect: New Zealand Art Now, City Gallery, Wellington (2011), group
 De-Building, Christchurch Art Gallery, Christchurch (2011), group
 Reading the map while driving, CalArts, Los Angeles (2011), solo
 Untitled (Mural Design), Dunedin Public Art Gallery, Dunedin (2012), solo
 Murals and Print, Various Small Fires, Los Angeles (2012), solo
 Made in L.A., Hammer Museum, Los Angeles (2012), group
Bare Use, 1301PE, Los Angeles (2013), solo
SCAPE Public Art Biennial, Christchurch (2013), group
Wallworks, Monash University Museum of Art, Melbourne (2014), solo
Inside Outside Upside Down: Five Contemporary New Zealand Artists, Auckland Art Gallery Toi o Tamaki (2015), group
Stories of Almost Everyone, Hammer Museum, Los Angeles (2018), group

Connor was a founding member of two art spaces in Auckland; Special, and Gambia Castle. She also established the project space Laurel Doody.

Connor was a finalist in the 2010 Walters Prize with her work Something Transparent (please go round the back) (first shown in 2009 at Michael Lett, Auckland).

In 2011, she received the Arts Foundation of New Zealand Award for Patronage donation from Chartwell Trust. She also received a New Work Grant in 2008 from Creative New Zealand.

Work by Connor are held in several public collections including Auckland Art Gallery. She is represented by the Hopkinson Mossman in Auckland, New Zealand.

References

External links
 Artist Profile: Fiona Connor, Auckland Art Gallery

1982 births
New Zealand painters
New Zealand women painters
Elam Art School alumni
University of California, San Diego alumni
University of Barcelona alumni
California Institute of the Arts alumni
Living people